Martine Claret (born 11 January 1955) is a French former swimmer. She competed in the women's 4 × 100 metre medley relay at the 1972 Summer Olympics.

References

External links
 

1955 births
Living people
French female swimmers
Olympic swimmers of France
Swimmers at the 1972 Summer Olympics
Place of birth missing (living people)